Pseudoeurycea orchimelas, commonly known as the San Martin worm salamander, is a species of salamander in the family Plethodontidae.

Description
Males measure  and females  in snout–vent length. The head is wider than the body; the eyes are protuberant. There are ten costal grooves. The specific name orchimelas, from the Greek orchis (=testicle) and melas (=black), refers to the black pigmentation of the outer epithelial layer of the testes and vasa deferentia in adult males. This trait distinguishes it from Pseudoeurycea orchileucos with white testes and vasa deferentia.

Habitat and conservation
Natural habitats of Pseudoeurycea orchimelas are lowland wet forests. They live in leaf litter terrestrially and fossorially. The species is threatened by habitat loss (deforestation) caused by expanding subsistence farming and human settlements and by logging. It is quite an abundant species but secretive.

References

orchimelas
Amphibians described in 2002
Endemic fauna of Los Tuxtlas
Endemic amphibians of Mexico
Taxonomy articles created by Polbot